Robert Charles Wong (born April 27, 1941) is a former politician in Ontario, Canada. He was a Liberal member of the Legislative Assembly of Ontario from 1987 to 1990 who represented the downtown Toronto riding of Fort York. He served as a cabinet minister in the provincial government of David Peterson.

Background
Wong was educated at the University of Toronto, York University, Harvard University, and the University of Waterloo, earning Bachelor of Science and M.B.A. degrees. He was a special assistant of the Minister of National Health and Welfare from 1968 to 1970, and served as special advisor to Canada's first Minister of State for Multiculturalism in 1972. Wong later served as president of the Toronto District Liberal Association from 1974 to 1976, and of the Ontario Chinese Liberal Association in 1986.  He also chaired the Toronto Ontario Olympic Committee, and was a member of the Multicultural Advisory Council.

In private life, served as chair of Goulding, Rose & Turner Ltd., and was a director of May Mikkila Inc., Abico Management Ltd., Multilingual Television Ltd., Channel 47 Toronto (Canada's first multilingual television station) and Sky Continental Management Inc.  He established the first brokerage office in Toronto's Chinatown, and was named Analyst of the year for 1980 by Financial Times of Canada. He also is the author of "Computing: An Introduction" and the co-author of "Algorithms", both published in 1967.

Politics
He was elected to the Ontario legislature in the 1987 provincial election, defeating Joe Pantalone of the New Democratic Party (NDP) by 137 votes in the downtown Toronto riding of Fort York.  He was appointed to cabinet on September 29, 1987 as Minister of Energy. He was named Minister of Citizenship responsible for race relations, multiculturalism and Ontario Human Rights Commission on August 2, 1989.

The Liberals were defeated by the NDP in the 1990 provincial election, and Wong lost the Fort York riding by about 1,500 votes to Rosario Marchese. He sought to return to the legislature in the 1995 election, but lost again to Marchese by over 2,000 votes.

Wong supported Gerard Kennedy for the leadership of the Ontario Liberal Party in 1996.

Cabinet positions

Later life
Wong was later appointed chair of the Canadian Automobile Association (CAA) Ontario's Government and Public Affairs Committee.  He is now Vice-Chairman and Portfolio Manager with Leon Frazer & Associates Ltd, and is a board member of the Royal Ontario Museum.

See also
 List of University of Waterloo people

References

External links

1941 births
Living people
Businesspeople from Toronto
Harvard University alumni
Members of the United Church of Canada
Ontario Liberal Party MPPs
People from Fort Erie, Ontario
Politicians from Toronto
Royal Ontario Museum
University of Toronto alumni
University of Waterloo alumni
York University alumni
Members of the Executive Council of Ontario
Canadian politicians of Chinese descent